Garissa Township Constituency (formerly Garissa Central/Dujis Constituency) is an electoral constituency in Kenya. It is one of six constituencies in Garissa County, and was established for the 1988 elections. The constituency is further subdivided into four Electoral Wards; namely, Waberi, Galbet, Township and Iftin.

Members of Parliament

Electoral wards

Notes

References
Politics and Parliamentarians in Kenya 1944–2007
County Assembly Wa

Constituencies in North Eastern Province (Kenya)